Tage Frid (30 May 1915 – 4 May 2004) was a Danish-born woodworker, educator and author who influenced the development of the studio furniture movement in the United States. His design work was often in the Danish-modern style, best known for his three legged stool and his publications.

Early life
Son of a silversmith, at the age of 13, he started a five-year apprenticeship in Copenhagen followed by work in cabinet shops; worked for nearly a decade at the Royal Danish Cabinetmakers,  then spent time in Iceland before immigrating to the United States in 1948 at the request of the American Craft Council.

Later career
Frid headed the program in woodworking of the School for American Craftsmen (SAC) in Alfred, New York; later moving with this program to Rochester Institute of Technology. In 1962 he became professor of Woodworking and Furniture Design at the Rhode Island School of Design (RISD), remaining until 1985.

When teaching, he emphasized a craftsman's need to learn all the available tools and methods one could use to complete a given task. Thus, the person can work in any shop situation and produce the same quality. Frid's students include noted American studio furniture makers such as Hank Gilpin, Jere Osgood, Alphonse Mattia, William Keyser, John Dunnigan, and Rosanne Somerson.

He was an editor of Fine Woodworking magazine from its inception in 1975 to his death.

In 2001, Tage Frid was honored by The Furniture Society with its Award of Distinction. The Permanent collection of the Museum of Fine Arts, Boston owns some of his designs, most of which represent the Danish modern style.

Publications
Frid is best known for his three-volume work, "Tage Frid Teaches Woodworking". Some editions of which are published as the first two volumes in one, the third is still separate (Frid's own classic European-style workbench is detailed, in a revised and corrected version, in the third edition of this essential series):

Further reading
 Hank Gilpin, "Professor Frid," Fine Woodworking magazine 146 (Winter 2000-1), pp. 80–85.
 John Kelsey, "Tage Frid: A Talk with the Old Master," Fine Woodworking magazine 52 (May–June 1985), pp. 66–67.
 Michael A. Stone, Contemporary American Woodworkers, Gibbs Smith, Salt Lake City UT, 1986, pp. 48–63.
 "Tage Frid" in Edward S. Cooke Jr., Gerald W.R. Ward, and Kelly H L'Ecuyer, The Maker's Hand: American Studio Furniture, 1940–1990, Museum of Fine Arts, Boston MA, 2003, p. 120.

References

External links
 Oral history interview with Tage Frid, from 1980 June 24 – 1982 February 22, Archives of American Art, Smithsonian Institution
 Furniture Society Award of Distinction
 Tage Frid's Obituary in the New York Times

1915 births
2004 deaths
American furniture designers
Rochester Institute of Technology faculty
Rhode Island School of Design faculty
American cabinetmakers
Danish furniture designers
Danish cabinetmakers
20th-century Danish woodworkers
Danish emigrants to the United States